Antônio Luiz Cantarele, usually known as Cantarele (born September 26, 1953 in Além Paraíba, Minas Gerais state), is a retired professional Brazilian footballer who played as a goalkeeper for Campeonato Brasileiro Série A clubs Flamengo and Náutico.

Career
Cantarele started his career playing for Flamengo, where he spent most of his career. Between 1973 and 1983, he won several titles, such as the Campeonato Carioca in 1974, 1978, the two 1979 championships, and 1981, the Campeonato Brasileiro Série A in 1980, 1982 and 1983, Copa Libertadores in 1981, and the Intercontinental Cup in 1981. He briefly played for Náutico of Recife, Pernambuco state in 1983, returning to Flamengo in 1984, where he played until his retirement in 1989, winning the Campeonato Carioca again in 1986 and the Campeonato Brasileiro Série A (Copa União) in 1987.

Goalkeeper coach career
After his retirement, he started working as a goalkeeper coach. He worked for Flamengo, Corinthians, with Vanderlei Luxemburgo, the Japanese national team during the 2006 FIFA World Cup, and Fenerbahçe, of Turkey. For Japan and Fenerbahçe, he worked with former Flamengo player Zico.

Honors
Cantarele won the following honors during his playing career:

References

1953 births
Living people
Brazilian footballers
CR Flamengo footballers
Clube Náutico Capibaribe players
Association football goalkeepers
Sportspeople from Minas Gerais